An internal wrenching nut, (also known as an Allenut or Allen nut), is a cylindrical nut that is internally threaded on one side and has an Allen socket on the other side; the outside of the nut is smooth or has knurling on it.

The Allen socket may be 6 point or 12 point (also known as a double hex socket). They are used where hex or square nuts won't fit.

References

Notes

Bibliography
.

Nuts (hardware)